Sivakumar a/l Munusamy (born 6 March 1984) is a Malaysian footballer who plays for Petaling Jaya City FC in Malaysia Super League. Sivakumar mainly plays as a defensive midfielder but also can play as a centre-back or as a central midfielder.

Club career

PKNS
On November 2014, Sivakumar signed with PKNS from Negeri Sembilan. He made 24 appearances during his debut season.

Personal life
Sivakumar married to Sabah Chinese-Kadazan wife.

References

External links
 

1984 births
Living people
Malaysian footballers
Malaysia Super League players
Perak F.C. players
Negeri Sembilan FA players
Felda United F.C. players
Johor Darul Ta'zim F.C. players
Sabah F.C. (Malaysia) players
PKNS F.C. players
People from Sabah
Malaysian people of Tamil descent
Malaysian sportspeople of Indian descent
Association football midfielders